How the West was Lost is a 1993 television documentary miniseries about the westward expansion across the North American continent during the latter half of the 19th Century from the point of view of the Native American peoples. The episodes used "more than 1,200 rare archival photographs, creating images that enhance the first-hand and personal tales of family and tribal history." It was directed by Chris Wheeler and Sonny Hutchison and narrated by Peter Thomas. It was produced by KUSA-TV for the Discovery Channel. The series won the Cable ACE award for "Educational Special or Series" in 1994.

Episodes 
A Clash of Cultures

This episode relives the Long Walk of 2,400 Navajos from their home in Canyon de Chelly to the Bosque Redondo in Eastern New Mexico.

I Will Fight No More, Forever

This episode follows the 1,600-mile path taken by the Nez Perce 114 years ago, as they fought 13 battles with the United States Army, for the right to the Nez Perce homeland.

Always the Enemy

This episode tells the story of Geronimo and Victorio.

The Only Good Indian, is a Dead Indian

This episode visits Sand Creek and other battlefields and talks to ancestors of the warriors.

A Good Day to Die

The episode tells the story of the Battle of Little Bighorn.

Kill the Indian, Save the Man

This episode tells the story of the final battles for Indian land - the Wounded Knee Massacre.

Divided We Fall

This episode traces the rise and fall of the Iroquois confederation.

The Trail of Tears

This episode tells the story of the tragic event known as The Trail of Tears.

Let them Eat Grass

The Dakotas thrived in what is today Minnesota until the settlers began to convert the area to farmland. Led by Chief Little Crow, the Dakotas embarked on a tragic war.

The Utes Must Go!

In 1873, Chief Ouray and the Utes yielded four million acres to gold miners. Still, the miners were dissatisfied and in 1876, sought to remove the Utes from the newly recognized state of Colorado and send them to Indian Territory.

The Unconquered

This episode tells the story of the Seminoles.

Death Will Come Soon Enough

This episode tells the story of the small Indian nation of Modoc which was forced to live on a reservation with the larger and more powerful nation of Klamath. The Modoc were unhappy and determined to return to their home in what is now Northern California.

As Long As the Grass Shall Grow

This final episode tells the story of the Cherokee, who enjoyed a Golden Age launched by an 1846 Treaty. But when the Civil War swept west, the railroads signaled the end of Cherokee sovereignty.

References

External links

 

1993 television films
1993 films
American documentary television series
Discovery Channel original programming
CableACE Award winners
1993 American television series debuts
1995 American television series endings